Sergio Marchi,  (born May 12, 1956), is a Canadian politician and former diplomat, who served as a federal Liberal Member of Parliament and cabinet minister and, later, as an ambassador.

Marchi was born in Argentina to an Italian family who subsequently emigrated to Canada.

He first entered politics at the municipal level, where he was elected Alderman for Ward 1 in North York (now part of Toronto) in 1982. He was subsequently elected to the House of Commons of Canada in the 1984 election as the Liberal Member of Parliament (MP) for the Toronto-area riding of York West.

When the Liberals came to power in the 1993 election, Prime Minister Jean Chrétien brought Marchi into the Canadian Cabinet as Minister of Citizenship and Immigration. He also served as Minister of the Environment and Minister of International Trade in 1997.

Marchi left politics in 1999 and was appointed as Canadian ambassador to the World Trade Organization, and the UN Agencies, in Geneva. He served one term as Chairman of the WTO's ruling council.

In 2005, it was reported in the media that Marchi might challenge incumbent David Miller for the Toronto mayoralty in the municipal election in 2006. Marchi said only that he was talking with people.

After leaving the diplomatic world, in February 2006, Marchi joined the Toronto law firm of Lang Michener LLP as a senior advisor, and also became President of the Canada China Business Council, and Chairman of the Canadian Services Coalition.

Marchi then took up a second tour in Geneva, to pursue a private sector opportunity, and established his own consultancy, the Marchi Group.

In February 2015, Marchi returned to Canada, where he was appointed President and CEO of the Canadian Electricity Association, headquartered in Ottawa.

References

External links

1956 births
Argentine emigrants to Canada
Argentine people of Italian descent
Canadian diplomats
Canadian people of Italian descent
Liberal Party of Canada MPs
Living people
Members of the 26th Canadian Ministry
Members of the House of Commons of Canada from Ontario
Members of the King's Privy Council for Canada
Naturalized citizens of Canada
York University alumni
Permanent Representatives to the World Trade Organization